The Meyers Aircraft Company was a US aircraft manufacturer established by Al Meyers in Tecumseh, Michigan in 1936 at what is now Meyers–Diver's Airport.

History 
Originally, the company produced a biplane trainer, the Meyers OTW, but after World War II developed a range of light utility aircraft, culminating in the Meyers 200. In 1965, the company and the rights to two of its aircraft, the 145 and 200 were purchased by the Aero Commander Division of Rockwell-Standard.

Post-acquisition 
In 1977, a company in Denver bought the tooling and rights to the Meyers 200 and attempted to put it back into production. By 1994, the type certificate for the MAC-145 was owned by a company in Fayetteville, North Carolina. By 1996, a company called the New Meyers Aircraft Company had started construction on a new factory in Fort Pierce, Florida. The company planned to build a development of the MAC-145 called the SP20.

Aircraft

References

External links

 
 Meyers Aircraft Owner Community by Type Certificate and OEM assets holder, Global Parts Group, Inc.

Defunct aircraft manufacturers of the United States
Tecumseh, Michigan

Defunct manufacturing companies based in Michigan